Fremont Indian State Park and Museum is a state park of Utah, US, which interprets archaeological remains of the Fremont culture.  The park is located in Sevier County, Utah in the Clear Creek Canyon.

The park directly adjoins Interstate 70 as it travels up the Clear Creek Canyon, and thus is highly accessible by auto. The nearest town with full services (motels, etc.) is Richfield. There are campgrounds and RV parks in the area as well.

The site was discovered during construction of Interstate 70, and thousands of artifacts have been excavated from the ancient village and put on permanent display at the museum there. The museum offers hiking trails and picnic areas.

The Fremont Indians were agriculturalists who lived from about 400 to 1300 in north and central Utah and adjacent parts of Colorado, Idaho and Nevada.  The Fremont are thought to have come from hunter-gatherers who previously lived in this location and were influenced by the Ancestral Puebloans who introduced corn and pottery, making year-round settlements possible.

Climate
Fremont Indian State Park has a borderline semi-arid and humid continental climate (Köppen BSk/Dfb), characterized by cold winters, warm-to-hot summers, and high diurnal temperature variation throughout the year.

References

External links

Fremont Indian State Park and Museum

Archaeological museums in Utah
Fishlake National Forest
Museums in Sevier County, Utah
Native American museums in Utah
Protected areas established in 1987
Protected areas of Sevier County, Utah
State parks of Utah
1987 establishments in Utah